Sunny Singh (born 20 May 1969) is an academic and writer of fiction and creative non-fiction. She is Professor of Creative Writing and Inclusion in the Arts at London Metropolitan University.

Early life and education  

Sunny Singh was born in Varanasi, India. Her father's work with the government meant that the family regularly moved, living in cantonments and outposts including Dehradun, Dibrugarh, Along and Teju. The family also followed her father's assignments abroad, living in Pakistan, the United States and Namibia.

Singh attended Brandeis University where she majored in English and American Literature. She holds a master's degree in Spanish Language, Literature and Culture from the Jawaharlal Nehru University and a PhD from the University of Barcelona, Spain.

Career  

Singh worked as a journalist and management executive in Mexico, Chile, and South Africa before returning to India in 1995 to focus on writing. She worked as a freelance writer and journalist until 2002 in New Delhi, publishing her first two books in that period. She moved to Barcelona in 2002 to work on her PhD and published her second novel in 2006.

Before her appointment as Professor in 2020, Singh was Senior Lecturer and Course Leader in Creative Writing at the London Metropolitan University.

Singh is the Chairperson of the Authors' Club. In 2016, Singh co-founded the Jhalak Prize for Book of the Year by a Writer of Colour. The award supports British writers with a one-thousand pound prize. It was initiated by Singh, Nikesh Shukla and Media Diversified, with support from The Authors’ Club and funds donated by an anonymous benefactor. Judges of the prize include Nikesh Shukla, Anita Sethi, Kerry Young, and Roy McFarlane. Previous winners include Guy Gunaratne (In Our Mad and Furious City, 2019), Reni Eddo-Lodge (Why I’m No Longer Talking To White People About Race, 2018), and Jacob Ross (The Bone Readers, 2017).

In mid-2021 she, with Monisha Rajesh and Chimene Suleyman, received racist abuse on social media as a result of raising concerns about depictions of autism and of students of colour in Kate Clanchy's book Some Kids I Taught and What They Taught Me. 
Rajesh characterised some of Clanchy's prose as "dehumanising", "racist", "anti-Black", "antisemitic" and "more like something a eugenicist might observe than a trusted teacher".

Literary works  

Singh has published three novels, two non-fiction books and numerous short stories and essays.

Singh's debut novel, Nani's Book of Suicides, won the Mar De Letras Prize in Spain in 2003. Her latest novel, Hotel Arcadia, was published by Quartet Books.

Books 

 Nani's Book of Suicides, HarperCollins Publishers India (2000) 
 Single in the City, Penguin Books Australia (2000) 
 With Krishna's Eyes, Rupa & Co (2006) 
 Hotel Arcadia, Quartet Books (2015) 
 Amitabh Bachchan, British Film Institute (2017)

Personal life 
Singh lives in London.

References

External links  
 Official website
 Sunny Singh Staff Profile Page, London Metropolitan University
 "Sunny Singh in Conversation with Jacob Ross, Lit Fest Online 2020", 15 May 2020
 "Hotel Arcadia - Book Trailer"

1969 births
21st-century Indian novelists
21st-century Indian women writers
Brandeis University alumni
English-language writers from India
Indian expatriates in Pakistan
Indian women novelists
Jawaharlal Nehru University alumni
Living people
Novelists from Uttar Pradesh
University of Barcelona alumni
Women writers from Uttar Pradesh
Writers from Varanasi